The Festival Internacional de Benicàssim, commonly abbreviated to simply FIB, is an annual  music festival that takes place in the town of Benicàssim, in the Valencian Community, Spain. It focuses mainly on pop, rock and electronica artists, as well as short films, fashion shows and art. FIB has a reputation of being among the best on the international festival circuit.
 
The festival begins on the second Tuesday of July, when the camping grounds open, although music officially commences Thursday afternoon. FIB is notable for having bands play through the night (5 pm8 am) and has three main stages, Las Palmas, Visa and South Beach Dance, with capacities of approximately 30,000, 15,000 and 8,000, respectively. In 2009, the festival capacity exceeded 50,000; in 2020, more than 150,000 visited the festival over the four days.

History
The first FIB took place in 1995. Since then, Benicàssim has been dedicated to rock, pop and electronic music as well as featuring artists who are a reference on the world stage.

Location
FIB is held in the seaside resort of Benicassim (Castellón province) on Costa del Azahar, Valencia, Spain, 92.2 km away from Valencia Airport. Festival goers who have purchased multi-day passes can camp for up to nine days starting the Monday before and ending Tuesday after the festival has ended.

Previous bands
Since the first festival in 1995, some of the most notable artists who have played the festival include The Arctic Monkeys, Beck, Blur, The Chemical Brothers, Depeche Mode, Franz Ferdinand, The Killers, Kraftwerk, Ladytron, Morrissey, Oasis, Placebo, Primal Scream, Radiohead, Lou Reed, Ride, Sigur Rós, The Stone Roses, The Strokes, Teenage Fanclub, Paul Weller and Brian Wilson.

2005 Festival
The eleventh festival took place on August 5–7, 2005, with The Cure, Keane and Oasis headlining. Underworld were later announced as headliners of the "FIBstart" event on Thursday July 4, supported by The Tears and The Polyphonic Spree. Fischerspooner, !!! and Róisín Murphy headlined the weekend on the Hellomoto Stage, while The Kills, Kaiser Chiefs and The Wedding Present headlined the Fiberfib.com Stage. Other bands playing the festival included Basement Jaxx, The Lemonheads, Hot Hot Heat, Kasabian, Nick Cave and the Bad Seeds, Yo La Tengo, Dinosaur Jr., LCD Soundsystem, Ladytron, Doves, Radio 4 and Richard Hawley.

2006 Festival
The 12th Benicàssim Festival occurred between July 20–23, 2006. Performers included Franz Ferdinand, The Pixies, Depeche Mode, Placebo, Echo & the Bunnymen, Madness, Morrissey, The Strokes, Scissor Sisters, Babyshambles, Beth Orton, Editors, The Futureheads, We Are Scientists, The Kooks and Art Brut, among others.

2007 Festival
The 13th edition of the festival was held on the July 19–22, 2007. For this year's festival (and all subsequent festivals thereafter), there was no Hellomoto Stage, with the Pista Pop stage expanded instead. The line-up was as follows:

Escenario Verde (Main Stage)

Fiberfib.com Stage

Afternoon Session

Night Session

Vodafone FIB Club Stage

Vueling Pista Pop Stage

2008 Festival
The 14th Edition of the festival was held on 17, 18, 19 and 20 July 2008.

Escenario Verde (Main Stage)

Fiberfib.com Stage

Vodafone FIB Club Stage

Samsung Pista Pop Stage

2008 Festival: Saturday Night Fiber

Saturday Night Fiber, a spin-off festival created in 2008, took place on the Saturday night of Benicàssim in Madrid.

2009 Festival
On December 23, 2008, two of the four headliners for the 2009 festival were announced as Kings of Leon and Franz Ferdinand. Kings of Leon had previously played the festival in 2007, while Franz Ferdinand headlined in 2006. Tickets were made available at a discounted launch price between December 15, 2008 and January 15, 2009, with a four-day weekend pass available for €160 (£140). This includes full festival entry between July 16–19, as well as camping between July 13–21. On 27 January 2009, it was reported that Oasis would also be joining the line-up. On 2 February 2009, NME confirmed that The Killers would be headlining the final night of the festival, with Franz Ferdinand playing Saturday 18 July and Kings of Leon playing Friday 17 July. The article also stated that Oasis would headlining the "FIBstart" event on 16 July 2009. BBC News Online confirmed that Paul Weller would be playing on Friday 17 July. On 26 February 2009, it was announced that The Psychedelic Furs, Friendly Fires, White Lies, The Bishops and Boys Noize had been added to the line-up, with Benicàssim's official website confirming which days the bands would be playing. Further line-up additions were made on 17 March 2009, and again on 2 April 2009. The line-up was as follows:

2009 festival disruption

On the night of Friday 17 July a large fire broke out in scrubland within a few hundred metres of the festival site. High winds contributed to the difficulty of fighting the fire and caused conditions on many of the stages to become unsafe. As a result, a number of acts including the Kings of Leon, Maxïmo Park, Boys Noize and Yuksek were unable to perform. Tom Tom Club did perform but had to be taken off for their own safety. Maxïmo Park performed the following night following a cancellation by Lily Allen.

Several hundred festival goers had to be evacuated from the campsite to a nearby sports hall. The festival resumed the following day with limited disruption. Glamour model Bianca Gascoigne and Ringtone artist Ross Kent were reported in tabloid newspapers as having "gone missing" but reappeared several days later.

2010 Festival

Escenario Verde (Main Stage)

Fiberfib.com Stage

Eastpak FIB Club Stage

Due to illness, Lily Allen's Sunday set was canceled and Ellie Goulding was moved up to replace her. Roy Pridmore was a late addition to the bill.

2011 Festival
Maravillas Stage

Fiberfib.com Stage

Fib Club

Jack Daniels Stage Saturday
The Dandies

2012 Festival
The 2012 Festival took place from July 12, 2012 - July 15, 2012.

Maravillas

Trident Senses

FIB Club

Controversy

FIB has received criticism from nationalist sectors in Spain, aimed at the fact that it does not support Valencian culture, even though it takes place in the Valencian Community and receives a high amount of public money to finance itself.
FIB's director Jose Luis Morán stated in an interview that he did not intend to include any band in the festival that had lyrics in Catalan, Euskera or Galego. Among the people and associations that have criticized this is Marina Albiol, an Esquerra Unida politician.

References

External links

Official website
Official MySpace FIB
Benicassim Festival Guide
Benicassim Festival information on flights and hotels
Photos from Festival Internacional de Benicàssim 2007
 Benicassim Festival Information Site
Benicassim festival transport and accommodation
Recommended Benicassim Festival Accommodation Provider

Music festivals in Spain
1995 establishments in Spain
Rock festivals in Spain
Electronic music festivals in Spain
Music festivals established in 1995